The 1963 Australia rugby union tour of South Africa  was a series of twenty matches played by the Australia national rugby union team between June and September 1963. The Wallabies tied the series with the Springboks winning two and losing two Tests.

The tour was one of the highlights of the successful "Thornett Era" of Australian Rugby, buoyed by the leadership skills of skipper John Thornett and the outstanding skills of greats of the game like Ken Catchpole, Peter Johnson and Rob Heming. Dick Marks and Peter Crittle also toured and would later become among the most influential administrators of Australian rugby.



The Matches
Scores and results list Australia's points tally first.

See also
 History of rugby union matches between Australia and South Africa

References

Australia national rugby union team tours
1963
Tour
tour